Gelu Barbu (14 April 1932 – 17 February 2016) was a Romanian-born Spanish ballet dancer and choreographer.

Life
Barbu was born in Lugoj, the son of composer Filaret Barbu. He received his basic training at the ballet school of the Romanian National Opera in Bucharest, where he was taught by  Anton Romanovski and Floria Capsali.

References

1932 births
2016 deaths
People from Lugoj
Romanian male ballet dancers
Romanian emigrants to Spain
Knights of the Order of the Star of Romania